Donuctenusa is a monotypic moth genus of the family Noctuidae. Its only species, Donuctenusa fiorii, is found in Ethiopia. Both the genus and species were first described by Emilio Berio in 1940.

References

Catocalinae
Monotypic moth genera